Last Day of Freedom is a 2015 American black and white and color animated short documentary film about racism, the US Criminal Justice System, and mental health issues. The documentary was well received by critics and earned numerous awards at various film festivals, and The International Documentary Association Best Short Documentary Award, at the 31st Annual IDA Documentary Awards. Last Day of Freedom was shortlisted with ten other documentaries from 74 entries submitted to 88th Academy Awards in Documentary Short Subject category, and eventually received a nomination in this category. In June 2016 the film won an Emmy Award for News and Program Specialty -Documentary-Topical, at the 45th Annual Northern California Area Emmy® Awards. The film was a finalist for a Documentary Short, 59th Cine Eagle Award.

Synopsis
Bill Babbitt supported the death penalty, until it came knocking at his door. Bill fondly recalls early life with his brother Manny, but a childhood car accident leaves Manny forever changed. Two tours in Vietnam only compound Manny’s mental health issues. After the war, bouts of paranoia leave him living on the streets. Concerned about his brother, Bill and his family invite Manny to come live with them in Sacramento. One day, however, Bill makes a shocking discovery that leaves him with an impossible choice: cover for his brother, or turn him in. Bill explores his attempt to do the “right” thing as familial bonds, mental illness and murder tug a close relationship in conflicting directions.

Awards
 Academy Awards  Best Documentary  Short Subject  Nomination  
 45th Annual Northern California Area EMMY® Award
 International Documentary Association  Best Short Documentary Award, 31st Annual IDA Documentary Awards 
 SIMA - Best Directors, Best Editing, & Stylistic Achievement Jury Prize Winner, 2017 
 Finalist, Short Documentary, 59th Cine Eagle Awards
 Full Frame Documentary Film Festival 
 Best Short Jury Award  
 Duke University, The Center for Documentary Studies Filmmaker Award  
 Hamptons International Film Festival  Best Documentary Short Film sponsored by ID Films.
 Tallgrass Film Festival  Golden Strands Award, Outstanding Documentary Short Film.
 Dok Leipzig  International Competition Animated Documentary  Honorary Mention
 Bar Harbor Film Festival  Best Animated Documentary Short
 SF Doc Fest- Best Short Audience Award
 (In)Justice For All Film Festival  Justice Impact Award
 Atlanta Docufest  Best Experimental Documentary Short
 DC Independent Film Festival - Best Short Documentary 17

See also
Mental illness in film
Death penalty

References

External links
 
 Last Day of Freedom on SND Films
 
 

2015 films
Documentary films about veterans
2015 short documentary films
American short documentary films
Black-and-white documentary films
American animated documentary films
Documentary films about racism
2010s English-language films
2010s American films